Marsha Tamika Henderson is a Saint Kitts and Nevis politician from the Saint Kitts and Nevis Labour Party.

Political career 
She is MP for St Christopher #2 and has been Minister of Tourism, Civil Aviation, and Urban Development in the Drew ministry since August 2022.

References 

Living people
Year of birth missing (living people)
Place of birth missing (living people)
Women government ministers of Saint Kitts and Nevis
Saint Kitts and Nevis women in politics

Members of the National Assembly (Saint Kitts and Nevis)
Saint Kitts and Nevis Labour Party politicians